Brad Oxley (born 6 October 1959) is a former speedway rider from the United States.

Speedway career 
Oxley became a North American champion after winning the AMA National Speedway Championship in 1987. Twelve years later he became the United States champion after winning the United States Individual Speedway Championship in 1999.

He rode in the top tier of British Speedway from 1981 to 1982, riding for Wimbledon Dons.

References 

1959 births
Living people
American speedway riders
Wimbledon Dons riders
People from Lynwood, California